Amelia Valverde Villalobos (born 14 January 1987) is a Costa Rican association football manager. She is currently the head coach of the Costa Rica women's national football team.

Valverde has been with the Costa Rica national team since 2011 in various roles, including assistant coach of the senior and under-20 teams. In January 2015 Valverde replaced Garabet Avedissian as the head coach.

References 

1987 births
Costa Rican football managers
Female association football managers
2015 FIFA Women's World Cup managers
Living people
Costa Rica women's national football team managers